The J. P. Brown House is a historic house in Atchison, Kansas. It was built in 1880 for John P. Brown, an Irish-born contractor for the Central Branch Union Pacific Railroad and one of Atchison's Exchange National Bank's largest shareholders. It has been listed on the National Register of Historic Places since April 14, 1975.

References

Houses on the National Register of Historic Places in Kansas
National Register of Historic Places in Atchison County, Kansas
Houses completed in 1880